Nutley is a township in Essex County, in the U.S. state of New Jersey. As of the 2020 United States census, the township's population was 30,143, an increase of 1,773 (+6.2%) from the 2010 census count of 28,370, which in turn reflected an increase of 1,008 (+3.7%) from the 27,362 counted in the 2000 census.

What is now Nutley was originally incorporated as Franklin Township by an act of the New Jersey Legislature on February 18, 1874, from portions of Belleville Township. Nutley was incorporated as a town on March 5, 1902, replacing Franklin Township. In 1981, the town was one of seven Essex County municipalities to pass a referendum to become a township, joining four municipalities that had already made the change, of what would ultimately be more than a dozen Essex County municipalities to reclassify themselves as townships in order take advantage of federal revenue sharing policies that allocated townships a greater share of government aid to municipalities on a per capita basis.

Nutley derived its name from the estate of the Satterthwaite family, established in 1844, which stretched along the Passaic River and from an artist's colony in the area.

History

Nutley grew slowly as Newark developed. The first European settler in the area, recorded in the minutes of a Newark town meeting in 1693, was a Dutch painter named Bastian Van Giesen. His house, known as Vreeland Homestead, still stands today on Chestnut Street and is the location of the Nutley Women's Club. John Treat and Thomas Stagg purchased lots adjacent to Van Geisen's in 1695 and 1698 respectively. The Van Riper House is another building from the era. During the revolutionary war, the  Continental Army, under the command of General George Washington, retreated from New York through Essex County and what is now Nutley.

The first brownstone quarry in Nutley is believed to have been in operation by the early 18th century and was the town's first major industry. Jobs at the brownstone quarry in the Avondale section of Nutley provided work for many Italian and Irish immigrants. Mills situated along the Third River in the area now known as Memorial Park I became Nutley's second major industry.

John and Thomas Speer, Joseph Kingsland, and Henry Duncan all operated mills in the town during the 1800s. Current streets in Nutley are named after these mill owners. Henry Duncan built several mills throughout the town and established the village of Franklinville consisting of 30 homes and a few small businesses which later became the center of Nutley. One of Duncan's buildings has been modified and now serves as the town hall. Kingsland Manor is a national historic place.

During the late 1880s, painter Frank Fowler founded an artists' colony on The Enclosure, a dead-end street that is near the Third River, a stream that runs through the town's parks. Later artist residents of the street included Frederick Dana Marsh, Reginald Marsh and muralist Michael Lenson.

Nutley's town historian, John Demmer, is the author of the book in the "Images of America" series titled Nutley; Demmer is also part of The Nutley Historical Society, a not-for-profit organization dedicated to serve the educational, cultural and historical needs of the community. The Nutley Historical Society manages the operation of The Nutley Historical Museum, housed in a former town schoolhouse at 65 Church Street.

Several other historical works on Nutley have been written by local historians, notably the late Ann Troy's Nutley: Yesterday – Today; "Nutley" by Marilyn Peters and Richard O'Connor in the "Then and Now" series; and books about the Nutley Velodrome. The board track racing facility was used in the 1930s for racing midget cars. Local resident Chris Economaki wrote extensively about the Nutley Velodrome in his autobiographical racing history Let Them All Go! as the Velodrome was the first racetrack he had visited as a child.

Geography
According to the United States Census Bureau, the township had a total area of 3.42 square miles (8.86 km2), including 3.37 square miles (8.74 km2) of land and 0.05 square miles (0.12 km2) of water (1.37%).

Unincorporated communities, localities and place names located partially or completely within the township include Avondale, Franklin, Glendale and Yanticaw.

The township borders the municipalities of Belleville and Bloomfield in Essex County; Lyndhurst in Bergen County; and Clifton in Passaic County.

Demographics

2010 census

The Census Bureau's 2006–2010 American Community Survey showed that (in 2010 inflation-adjusted dollars) median household income was $76,167 (with a margin of error of +/− $3,896) and the median family income was $98,042 (+/− $4,394). Males had a median income of $64,736 (+/− $4,840) versus $52,410 (+/− $3,558) for females. The per capita income for the borough was $37,706 (+/− $1,918). About 3.1% of families and 4.3% of the population were below the poverty line, including 4.9% of those under age 18 and 5.9% of those age 65 or over.

2000 census
As of the 2000 United States census, there were 27,362 people, 10,884 households, and 7,368 families residing in the township. The population density was 8,123.0 people per square mile (3,134.9/km2). There were 11,118 housing units at an average density of 1, 273.8/km2 (3,300.6/sq mi). The racial makeup of the township was 87.95% White, 1.87% African American, 0.05% Native American, 7.10% Asian, 0.04% Pacific Islander, 1.75% from other races, and 1.24% from two or more races. Hispanic or Latino of any race were 6.69% of the population.

As of the 2000 Census, 36.0% of town residents were of Italian ancestry, the 12th-highest percentage of any municipality in the United States, and fifth-highest in New Jersey, among all places with more than 1,000 residents identifying their ancestry.

There were 10,884 households, out of which 29.3% had children under the age of 18 living with them, 54.0% were married couples living together, 10.5% had a female householder with no husband present, and 32.3% were non-families. 27.9% of all households were made up of individuals, and 11.4% had someone living alone who was 65 years of age or older. The average household size was 2.51 and the average family size was 3.11.

In the town the population was spread out, with 21.8% under the age of 18, 6.4% from 18 to 24, 31.6% from 25 to 44, 24.1% from 45 to 64, and 16.1% who were 65 years of age or older. The median age was 39 years. For every 100 females, there were 89.4 males. For every 100 females age 18 and over, there were 85.0 males.

The median income for a household in the township was $59,634, and the median income for a family was $73,264. Males had a median income of $51,121 versus $37,100 for females. The per capita income for the township was $28,039. About 3.4% of families and 4.8% of the population were below the poverty line, including 4.4% of those under age 18 and 7.9% of those age 65 or over.

Economy
Nutley had been the U.S. headquarters of Hoffmann-La Roche and was the site of the creations of the medications Valium and Librium, later becoming one of the major R&D sites for Roche, hosting major research areas in oncology, virology and inflammation. Roche announced in June 2012 that operations at the site would end in 2013, leading to the elimination of 1,000 positions at the company, and that the facility would be shuttered by year end 2015. Located in Nutley since 1929, the company had reached a peak of 10,000 employees on the site, and the $9 million paid by the company in local property taxes accounted for 9% of the township's tax revenues.

Parks and recreation
Nutley's parks include Booth Park, DeMuro Park, Father Glotzbach Park, Msgr Owens Park, Flora Louden Park, Kingsland Park, Memorial Park I, II, III, Nichols Park, and Rheinheimer Park. They offer fields for baseball, football, basketball, lacrosse, roller hockey, and soccer among other sports. The township hosts a weekly Market Walk and Talk beginning and ending at the township farmer's market where participants take a one-hour loop through the local scenic parks.

Government

Local representation
Nutley has operated a commission form of government under the Walsh Act since 1912. The township is one of 30 municipalities (of the 564) statewide that use the commission form of government. The governing body is comprised of five commissioners, who are elected on a non-partisan basis to serve four-year concurrent terms as part of the May municipal election. The commissioners also serve as department heads in addition to their legislative functions. The Commissioners elect one Commissioner as Mayor. Historically the Commissioner that receives the most votes is appointed Mayor. The mayor is only responsible for his or her departments and serves as the chair of the commission. The Nutley Police Department provides law enforcement services.

 and continuing through May 21, 2024, members of Nutley's Board of Commissioners are 
Mayor Dr. Joseph P. Scarpelli (Commissioner of Public Works), 
Thomas J. Evans (Commissioner of Revenue and Finance), 
John V. Kelly III (Commissioner of Public Affairs), 
Alphonse Petracco (Commissioner of Public Safety) and 
Mauro G. Tucci (Commissioner of Parks and Public Property). After finishing the election tied for first place with 4,586 votes, Scarpelli and Tucci agreed to rotate in the role as mayor, with Tucci serving first.

Federal, state and county representation

Nutley is located in the 11th Congressional District and is part of New Jersey's 28th state legislative district. Prior to the 2011 reapportionment following the 2010 Census, Nutley had been in the 36th state legislative district.

Politics
As of March 2011, there were a total of 18,833 registered voters in Nutley, of which 5,737 (30.5%) were registered as Democrats, 3,753 (19.9%) were registered as Republicans and 9,327 (49.5%) were registered as Unaffiliated. There were 142 voters registered as Libertarians or Greens.

In the 2016 presidential election, Republican Donald Trump received 49.9% (7,061 votes), edging out Democrat Hillary Clinton with 46.9% (6,634 votes). In the 2012 presidential election, incumbent Democrat Barack Obama received 50.33% of the vote (6,507 votes), ahead of Republican Mitt Romney with 48.52% (6,273 votes) and other candidates with 1.14% (148 votes), among the 12,928 ballots cast by the township's 19,623 registered voters, for a turnout of 65.88%. In the 2008 presidential election, Republican John McCain received 52.4% of the vote (7,325 cast), ahead of Democrat Barack Obama with 45.6% (6,374 votes) and other candidates with 1.2% (163 votes), among the 13,985 ballots cast by the township's 18,853 registered voters, for a turnout of 74.2%. In the 2004 presidential election, Republican George W. Bush received 54.5% of the vote (7,579 ballots cast), outpolling Democrat John Kerry with 43.8% (6,099 votes) and other candidates with 0.6% (106 votes), among the 13,914 ballots cast by the township's 18,087 registered voters, for a turnout percentage of 76.9.

In the 2013 gubernatorial election, Republican Chris Christie received 57.4% of the vote (4,497 cast), ahead of Democrat Barbara Buono with 41.3% (3,234 votes), and other candidates with 1.3% (100 votes), among the 7,950 ballots cast by the township's 19,559 registered voters (119 ballots were spoiled), for a turnout of 40.6%. In the 2009 gubernatorial election, Republican Chris Christie received 52.9% of the vote (4,684 ballots cast), ahead of Democrat Jon Corzine with 38.6% (3,416 votes), Independent Chris Daggett with 6.8% (601 votes) and other candidates with 1.0% (92 votes), among the 8,859 ballots cast by the township's 18,793 registered voters, yielding a 47.1% turnout.

Education
The Nutley Public Schools serve students in pre-kindergarten through twelfth grade. As of the 2020–21 school year, the district, comprised of seven schools, had an enrollment of 4,041 students and 323.8 classroom teachers (on an FTE basis), for a student–teacher ratio of 12.5:1. Schools in the district (with 2020–21 enrollment data from the National Center for Education Statistics) are 
Lincoln School with 447 students in grades K–6, 
Radcliffe School with 341 students in grades K–6, 
Spring Garden School with 416 students in grades Pre-K–6, 
Washington School with 523 students in grades K–6, 
Yantacaw School with 461 students in grades K–6, 
John H. Walker Middle School with 651 students in grades 7–8 and 
Nutley High School with 1,143 students in grades 9–12. John H. Walker Middle School, formerly Franklin Middle School, was renamed in 2009 to honor John H. Walker who was a long-time educator and principal in the township.

Transportation

Roads and highways

The Garden State Parkway clips the southwest corner of the township, entering in the south from Bloomfield before reentering Bloomfield in the north. Route 21 follows the township's eastern border.

Public transportation
NJ Transit provides bus service between the township and the Port Authority Bus Terminal in Midtown Manhattan on the 192 route, to Newark on the 13, 27, 72 and 74 routes, with local service on the 709 route.

Until 1966, the Newark Branch of the Erie-Lackawanna Railroad served the township with stations at Walnut Street, Highfield Street and at Franklin Avenue. The Newark Branch tracks are now used for freight only, operated by Norfolk Southern.

Operation Nutley Cares
After Hurricane Katrina devastated the central gulf coast region on August 29, 2005, Mayor Joanne Cocchiola and Commissioner Carmen A. Orechio reached out to local residents who wanted to help victims of the devastation, and formed the Operation Nutley Cares Committee. A decision was made to adopt Bay St. Louis, Mississippi as a sister city, Bay St. Louis, population 8,500, which sits just northeast of New Orleans, and had at least 60% of the community completely destroyed by Katrina and another 20% condemned. Monetary donations are still being accepted to help fund efforts to assist Bay St. Louis.

Notable people

 Alaa Abdelnaby (born 1968), former NBA basketball player
 Dorothy Allison (1924–1999), psychic 
 Edith "Big Edie" Ewing Bouvier Beale (1895–1977), socialite, amateur singer and aunt of former U.S. First Lady Jacqueline Kennedy Onassis; featured along with her daughter, also named Edith "Little Edie" Bouvier Beale, in the 1975 documentary film Grey Gardens
 Julian Bigelow (1913–2003), pioneering computer engineer
 Phyllis Birkby (1932–1994), architect and feminist
 Julian "Bud" Blake (1918–2005), cartoonist (Tiger)
 Robert Blake (born 1933), actor (Baretta)
 Carol Blazejowski, (born 1956), general manager of the WNBA's New York Liberty
 Ray Blum (1919–2000), speed skater who represented the United States at the 1948 Winter Olympics
 Anthony Bowens, professional wrestler signed to All Elite Wrestling
 Alan Branigan (born 1975, class of 1993), Ivorian-born professional soccer player
 Henry Cuyler Bunner (1855–1896), novelist
 Barbara Buono (born 1953), New Jersey State Senator who has represented the 18th Legislative District since 2002
 Jane Burgio (1922–2005), member of the New Jersey General Assembly who served as secretary of state of New Jersey
 Tina Cervasio (born 1974), sportscaster, best known for her work as the Boston Red Sox sideline reporter on NESN telecasts
 P. C. Chang (1892–1957), Chinese academic, philosopher, playwright, human rights activist, and diplomat
Clams Casino (born 1987 as Mike Volpe), hip hop producer
 Joseph N. DiVincenzo Jr. (born 1952), county executive of Essex County since 2003
 Doug Edert (born 2000), college basketball player for the Saint Peter's Peacocks of the Metro Atlantic Athletic Conference
 Gary T. Erbe (born 1944), self-taught oil painter, best known for his trompe-l'œils, who maintains his studio in Nutley
 Ken Eulo (born 1939), Eugene O'Neill Award-winning writer and bestselling author whose novels have collectively sold over 13 million copies worldwide
 Mary Sargant Florence (1857–1954), British painter of figure subjects, mural decorations in fresco and occasional landscapes in watercolour and pastel
 Philip Sargant Florence (1890–1982), economist
 Frank Fowler (1852–1910), painter
 Ron Fraser (1933–2013), "Wizard of College Baseball", Baseball coach at University of Miami
 Garry Furnari (born 1954), politician who served in the New Jersey Senate and in New Jersey Superior Court and was Mayor of Nutley from 1996 to 2003
 Paul Goldberger (born 1950), Pulitzer Prize winner and architecture critic for The New Yorker
 Frances Goodrich (1890–1984), dramatist and screenwriter, best known for her collaborations with her partner and husband Albert Hackett
 Al Haig (1922–1982), jazz pianist, best known as one of the pioneers of bebop
 Ben Hawkins (1944–2017), professional American football wide receiver who played in the NFL for the Philadelphia Eagles and Cleveland Browns, and for the Philadelphia Bell of the World Football League
 Christine E. Haycock (1924–2008), nurse and surgeon who served as a colonel in the United States Army Reserve and as a professor of surgery and Director of Emergency Services at the New Jersey Medical School
 Lloyd Huck (1922–2012), business executive, philanthropist and aviation enthusiast, who was chairman of pharmaceutical firms Merck & Co. and of Mutual Benefit Life Insurance Company
 John V. Kelly (1926–2009), served in the New Jersey General Assembly and elected as Mayor of Nutley in 1988
 Frank Kirkleski (1904–1980), football player who played in the early years of the National Football League
 Frank Lautenberg (1924–2013), United States senator
 Michael Lenson (1903–1971), painter and muralist
 Anne Steele Marsh (1901–1995), painter and printmaker whose watercolors, oil paintings and wood engravings were widely exhibited
 Frederick Dana Marsh (1872–1961), illustrator
 Reginald Marsh (1898–1954), painter
 Frank McDonald (born ), football player who played as an end for the Miami Hurricanes football team
 Abram Molarsky (1880–1955), Impressionist and Post-Impressionist painter best known for his landscapes
 Annie Oakley (1860–1926), sharpshooter
 Carl Orechio (1914–1991), politician who served in the New Jersey General Assembly from 1972 to 1982
 Carmen A. Orechio (1926–2018), President of the New Jersey Senate who spent 40 years as a commissioner in Nutley
 Carlo Jackie Paris (1926–2004), jazz singer and guitarist
 Andrew Pecora (born 1957), hematologist and oncologist who has been involved in the research on the use of stem cells and oncolytic viruses to treat diseases, including cancer
 William Pène du Bois (1916–1993), author, artist
 Stephen Petronio (born 1956), choreographer
 Eileen Poiani, mathematician who was the first female mathematics instructor at Saint Peter's University
 Mark Radice, singer, musician, and producer
 Kevin J. Ryan (born 1969), former member of the New Jersey General Assembly
 Frederick Scalera (born 1958), politician who served in the New Jersey General Assembly from 2003 to 2011 and serves on the Board of Education of the Nutley Public Schools
 Connie Siskowski, activist for young people who are caring for ill, disabled, or aging family members
 Raphael Sonenshein (born 1949), executive director of the Los Angeles Charter Reform Commission and chairman of the political science department at California State University, Fullerton
 Frederic Dorr Steele (1873–1944), illustrator
 Martha Stewart (born 1941 as Martha Helen Kostyra), author, businesswoman, magazine publisher and television personality
 Frank R. Stockton (1834–1902), writer, best known for his short story "The Lady or the Tiger?"
 Alix Strachey (1892–1973), psychoanalyst, born Alix Sargant-Florence, translated Sigmund Freud's works into English
 Sharon Van Etten (born 1981), singer-songwriter
 Geerat J. Vermeij (born 1946), professor of geology at the University of California, Davis
 Frank Vincent (1937–2017), actor who played prominent roles in the HBO series The Sopranos and in several films for director Martin Scorsese: Raging Bull (1980), Goodfellas (1990) and Casino (1995)
 Nick Zano (born 1978), actor
 Eli Zaret (born 1950), sports broadcaster and journalist

Cultural references
 Aerosmith played at the Nutley prom in the 1960s.
 George Dorn, in The Illuminatus! Trilogy, is described as having grown up in Nutley, with references to his childhood illustrating that the authors had more than a passing familiarity with the town.
 Antiwar activist and Quaker Carl Hinke became the last American arrested for the Vietnam War draft Opposition to the Vietnam War on December 12, 1976. He had moved to Canada due to his pacifist convictions after being offered a one-way ticket to North Vietnam by Nutley's American Legion and Veterans of Foreign Wars chapters. Hinke was pardoned by Jimmy Carter on January 21, 1977, in his first official act as president.
 Weird NJ runs regular features on past and present Nutley destinations such as Franklin Avenue beat coffee house, Angelo Nardone's Villa Capri which town council tried to close for decades and various Nutley "old man" bars such as the Old Canal Inn Nutley was also used as a shooting location for the 1999 film Weird N.J.
 The courtroom in NBC's television show Ed was an exact replica of Nutley's municipal courtroom, and various locations in the township were used during filming, including the outside of the Public Safety building.
 The short-lived Fox television show Quintuplets was set in Nutley.
 Celebrity homemaker Martha Stewart, has shared her childhood memories of Nutley on her television shows, and had a "Nutley Day" on her talk show Martha, in 2006.
 Nutley was referenced in the Futurama episode No. 210 "Put Your Head on My Shoulders" as the destination of the bus stop where Bender found all of the undesirable Valentine's Day dates for his dating service customers ("Can't hon', I gotta catch my bus back to Nutley.", "Excuse me, did you say '10:15 to Nutley'?" and "Anybody else for Nutley?"), in The Beast with a Billion Backs ("This place makes Nutley look like crap.") and in Into the Wild Green Yonder ("Beats Nutley on a Saturday night.").
 ECW wrestler Balls Mahoney was billed as being from Nutley.
 On Saturday Night Live, aired January 12, 2001, episode hosted by Derek Jeter. Derek Jeter stars in a fake commercial for Derek Jeter's Taco Hole, which is located in Nutley, NJ. Premise: Derek Jeter is a great chef and during the off-season he sells tacos. Lyrics sung to The Beach Boys' Kokomo song: "... Just off Route 3, There's a place called Nutley, New Jersey, If good Mexican food is your goal, There's just one place you should go, Derek Jeter's Taco Hole".
 In What We Do in the Shadows Season 3, Episode 6 "The Escape," a home in Nutley, NJ becomes the residence for The Sire, The Baron, and a hellhound.

References

External links

 Township of Nutley
 Nutley Public Schools
 
 School Data for the Nutley Public Schools, National Center for Education Statistics
 Nutley Sun
 NutleyTown.com – All About Nutley, New Jersey

 
1902 establishments in New Jersey
Populated places established in 1902
Townships in Essex County, New Jersey
Walsh Act